Bondokuy is a department or commune of Mouhoun Province in western Burkina Faso. Its capital lies at the town of Bondokuy. According to the 1996 census the department has a total population of 47,213.

Towns and villages
 Anekuy	(295 inhabitants)
 Bankouma	(729 inhabitants)
 Bokuy	(421 inhabitants)
 Bondokuy (3 982 inhabitants) (capital)
 Bolomakoté	(3 792 inhabitants)
 Bouan	(1 084 inhabitants)
 Bouenivouhoun	(3 936 inhabitants)
 Dampan	(826 inhabitants)
 Diekuy	(292 inhabitants)
 Dora	(2 021 inhabitants)
 Farakuy	(142 inhabitants)
 Kera	(2 047 inhabitants)
 Koko	(2 065 inhabitants)
 Koumana	(9 767 inhabitants)
 Moukouna	(2 493 inhabitants)
 Ouakara	(2 909 inhabitants)
 Silmimossi	(1 605 inhabitants)
 Syn-Bekuy	(387 inhabitants)
 Syn-Dombokuy	(335 inhabitants)
 Syn-Dounkuy	(367 inhabitants)
 Tankuy	(930 inhabitants)
 Tia	(2 504 inhabitants)
 Toun	(1 018 inhabitants)
 Wakuy	(1 376 inhabitants)
 Zanzaka	(1 131 inhabitants)
 Zoromtenga	(759 inhabitants)

References

Departments of Burkina Faso
Mouhoun Province